This is the current list of the national symbols of China. The People's Republic of China (PRC) controls all of mainland China, while the Republic of China (ROC) controls Taiwan and nearby islands. See National symbols of Taiwan. Both countries used to claim to be the legitimate government of all of China, with Taiwan informally dropping territorial claims in the early nineties.

The national emblem means "national crest / shield emblem and logo design", which represents the image and dignity of the country's political power and people. It is one of the symbols of a country's political power. The definition of China's national emblem is explained in Article 3 of the national emblem law of the people's Republic of China: "the national emblem of the people's Republic of China is the symbol and symbol of the people's Republic of China." the national emblem and the national flag are the symbols of the same country. In essence, they are the identification symbol design of a state power and the symbolic symbol of a state power. However, in the long historical evolution and practical application, the design of signal flag with stronger visual recognition characteristics has gradually evolved into the design of national flag, while the worship and beautification of totem has evolved into the theory of Heraldry and the design of national emblem.

The national emblem appearing in modern times is often designed directly based on European heraldry. But in fact, the development of national emblem design in human society also has a long process. As a symbol of a country, even without the artistic concept of European heraldry, human beings will explore totem worship with similar concept in social practice. For example, there was no legal national emblem in the Qing Dynasty, but the "dragon" totem in the "Yellow Dragon flag" was widely used as a substantive national emblem in the official designs of the government such as silver coins and passports.

In the early days of the People's Republic of China, there was also the design of the national seal with the nature of the national emblem. In ancient China, the national seal was the certificate of the emperors of the orthodox dynasties in previous dynasties. Its symbolic power and stamping effect were similar to that of the modern national emblem. When the people's Republic of China was just established, it also took the traditional seal designed based on the traditional seal as an official duty (for example, the national seal "seal of the Central People's Government of the people's Republic of China" in the National Museum of China), but later it was officially changed to the European round seal design.

Symbols of the People’s Republic of China

See also 
National symbols of Taiwan

References